Pinecrest is an unincorporated community in Nevada County, California. It lies at an elevation of 2438 feet (743 m).

References

Unincorporated communities in California
Unincorporated communities in Nevada County, California